Cossulus mollis is a moth in the family Cossidae. It is found in Turkmenistan and Iraq.

The length of the forewings is 13–15 mm. The forewings are greyish with a pattern of light and dark elements. There is a dark-grey area in the central part of the wing. The hindwings vary from uniform white to greyish.

Subspecies
Cossulus mollis mollis (Turkmenistan)
Cossulus mollis muelleri Yakovlev, 2006 (Iraq)

References

Natural History Museum Lepidoptera generic names catalog

Moths described in 1887
Cossinae
Moths of Asia